Senjan is a city in Markazi Province, Iran.

Senjan may refer to: